Rich Bar is an unincorporated settlement and adjoining Indian Reserve community located just south of Quesnel, British Columbia, Canada.  The locality includes Rich Bar Indian Reserve No. 4, one of the reserves of the Red Bluff First Nation.

See also
Red Bluff, British Columbia
Dragon Lake, British Columbia

References

Unincorporated settlements in British Columbia
Populated places on the Fraser River
Populated places in the Cariboo Regional District
Geography of the Cariboo